Rosalia  Vila Tobella (born 25 September 1992), known mononymously as Rosalía, is a Spanish singer and songwriter. Born and raised in the outskirts of Barcelona, she has been described as an "atypical pop star" due to her genre-bending musical styles. After being enthralled by Spanish folk music at age 13, she studied musicology at Catalonia College of Music while also performing at musical bars and weddings.

She completed her studies with honors by virtue of her collaborative cover album with Raül Refree, Los Ángeles (2017), and the baccalaureate project El Mal Querer (2018). Reimagining flamenco by mixing it with pop and hip hop music, it spawned the singles "Malamente" and "Pienso en tu Mirá", which caught the attention of the Spanish general public, and were released to universal critical acclaim. Recipient of the Latin Grammy Award for Album of the Year and listed in Rolling Stones 500 Greatest Albums of All Time, El Mal Querer started the ascent of Rosalía into the international music scene. Rosalía explored urbano music with her 2019 releases "Con Altura" and "Yo x Ti, Tú x Mí", achieving global success. She gave reggaeton an experimental twist on her third studio album Motomami (2022), departing from the new flamenco sound of its predecessor. The album caught international attention with its singles "La Fama" and "Saoko" and became the best reviewed album of the year on Metacritic.

Throughout her career, Rosalía has accumulated ten number-one singles in her home country, the most for a local artist. She has also won two Grammy Awards, eleven Latin Grammy Awards (including two Album of the Year wins), four MTV Video Music Awards, an MTV Europe Music Award, three UK Music Video Awards and two Premio Ruido awards, among others. In 2019, Billboard gave her the Rising Star Award for "changing the sound of today's mainstream music with her fresh flamenco-influenced pop", and became the first Spanish-singing act in history to be nominated for Best New Artist at the Grammys. She is widely considered one of the most successful and influential Spanish singers of all-time.

Life and career

1992–2016: Early life and career beginnings 
Rosalía was born on 25 September 1992 in Sant Cugat del Vallès and raised in Sant Esteve Sesrovires, Baix Llobregat, Catalonia. Born in a family with no artistic background, she is the youngest daughter of Pilar Tobella, a businesswoman who runs a small family company specialised in metalworks. Her father, José Manuel Vila, was born in Cudillero, Asturias. They separated in 2019. She has an older sister, Pilar "Pili" Vila (born 1989), who works with Rosalía as her stylist and creative director. Rosalía expressed interest in the performing arts at an early age, especially after discovering the discography of Camarón de la Isla. She began her musical education at the Taller de Músics. She did a six-year course at the academy. She began attending class at the Raval school, later transfering to the Superior School of Music of Catalonia. She also autonomously worked as an independent singer at weddings and musical bars, for which she was paid "a little over 80 euros or in exchange for dinner". During that time, Rosalía met many underground Spanish artists who would later succeed such as La Zowi, Yung Beef, Kaydy Cain, Hinds and María Escarmiento.

At 15, she competed on the television show Tú Sí Que Vales, although she wasn't selected. At 17, she had to undergo vocal cord surgery after tearing one of her vocal cords due to "intense singing practices" and was unable to sing for a year. In 2012, she became the vocalist of Kejaleo, a flamenco music group featuring Jordi Franco, Roger Blavia, Cristo Fontecilla, Diego Cortés and Xavi Turull. They released an album, Alaire, in 2013. That same year, Rosalía professionally worked as a duo with Juan "Chicuelo" Gómez to promote the Blancanieves soundtrack at the 2013 Panama International Film Festival in substitution of Sílvia Pérez Cruz and at the Festival Grec de Barcelona for the contemporary dance work De Carmen. In 2013, she participated in the Association of Performing Arts Professionals (APAP) Conference in New York, and was the lead voice in the culmination of the Any Espriu 2014. In 2015, she collaborated with La Fura dels Baus on a show that premiered in Singapore. She was the opening act for flamenco artist Miguel Poveda, accompanied by Alfredo Lagos, at the International Music Festival of Cadaqués, and also at the 2016 Jerez Jazz Festival. She worked with Rocío Márquez on the presentation of her album El Niño, produced by Raül Refree, at Primavera Sound. In 2015, she also worked with clothing brand Desigual and sang the single for their campaign jingle "Last Night Was Eternal". and self-released "Un Millón de Veces" included in the benefit album Tres Guitarras Para el Autismo. At 20, she worked as a flamenco teacher and vocal coach.
In 2016, Rosalía collaborated with Spanish rapper and former boyfriend C. Tangana on "Antes de Morirme". The song was a sleeper hit and entered the Spanish Singles Chart in 2018, after the success of Rosalía's newer material. The collaboration received international attention when it was featured on the soundtrack of the first season of Spanish Netflix show Élite.

2016–2017: Los Ángeles 

In 2016, Rosalía performed to a crowd of a hundred people at the Tablao del Carmen, a flamenco specialized venue at the Pueblo Español, in Barcelona. In the audience was Raül Refree, whom she invited to the show. They began working on two albums together. Rosalía signed with Universal Music later in 2016, and she relocated to California. She went on to only release Los Ángeles. The album talks about death in a dark way with aggressive guitar chords by Refree. It presents reworks of flamenco classics receiving several accolades. She was nominated for Best New Artist at the 18th Latin Grammy Awards. The album was released on 10 February 2017 through Universal Music and spawned two singles, "Catalina", released in October 2016, and "De Plata", released in May 2017. The album was very well received by critics. Jordi Bardají wrote in 2018 that the record was "one of the greatest 'sleepers' that Spanish sales lists have known in recent times." Los Ángeles reached its peak position of number nine on 11 November 2018 and has remained in the albums chart since its entry, having accumulated a total of 89 weeks. Los Ángeles won the "Album of the Year" award at the Time Out Awards and the Premio Ruido, among others. In 2017, RTVE contacted Rosalía to participate in the pre-selection to represent Spain in the Eurovision Song Contest 2017, which she declined because of scheduling conflicts with the promotion of her debut record.

Rosalía and Raül Refree embarked on a concert tour, Los Ángeles Tour, supporting their first studio album together. The tour began on 11 February 2017 in Granada and ended on 1 March 2018 at the Palau de la Música in Barcelona. Spanish singer Bebe attended one of their concerts in Madrid alongside Juanes, who became "immediately obsessed with Rosalía" and asked his manager Rebeca León to work with her. She agreed to manage her as she felt like she was a "once in fifty years kind of artist".

2018–2020: El Mal Querer and international recognition 
The recording cycle for Rosalía's second studio album, El Mal Querer, began in early 2017 as her baccalaureate project, graduating from the Catalonia College of Music. She personally chose to work alongside Spanish musician El Guincho and spawned its concept alongside friend Ferran Echegaray, who bet on the Romance of Flamenca to follow the album's storyline. Despite having no budget to produce the record as she was an independent artist working on a university project, Rosalía invested a lot of her own money, to the point of "almost going bankrupt". The album was almost completely recorded at El Guincho's apartment in Barcelona with a computer, a microphone and a sound table. It would mix traditional flamenco with today's pop and urban music.

In May 2018, the singer announced the title of her upcoming album in a little homemade YouTube series. J Balvin parallelly released his fifth studio album, Vibras, which featured Rosalía on the track "Brillo". Later that month, Rosalía released the album's lead single "Malamente". The single caught the attention of international personalities such as Kourtney Kardashian and Dua Lipa and numerous music critics, while its Canada-directed music video reached social media virality. The song was nominated for five Latin Grammy Awards, out of it won two, for Best Alternative Song and for Best Urban Fusion/Performance. The follow-up single, "Pienso en tu Mirá", was released in July. Its music video received critical acclaim for its aesthetics and poetic symbolism. The song was nominated for Best Pop Song at the 2019 Latin Grammy Awards. The third single, "Di Mi Nombre", released three days prior to the album, earned Rosalía her first number-one single in Spain.

El Mal Querer was released on 2 November 2018 and debuted at number two on the PROMUSICAE chart. Presented as experimental and conceptual, it revolves around a toxic relationship described in the anonymous 13th-century Occitan novel Flamenca. The album was met with universal acclaim by music critics. Writing for The Guardian, head critic Alexis Petridis highly commended the album, giving it the highest rating and describing it as "the calling card of a unique new talent". El Mal Querer was listed in over twenty album year-end and decade-end lists by publications such as Pitchfork, Billboard and The Guardian. Rolling Stone listed it 315th on their 500 Greatest Albums of All Time list, making it the highest Spanish-language album in the list. El Mal Querer was later nominated for several awards including four Latin Grammys, a Latin Billboard Music award, a Latin American Music award and a LOS40 Music award. It won the Latin Grammy awards for Album of the Year, Best Contemporary Pop Vocal Album, Best Engineered Album and Best Recording Package. Therefore, Rosalía became the first female recipient of the Latin Grammy Award for Album of the Year since Shakira in 2006. It also won a Grammy Award for Best Latin Rock, Urban or Alternative Album.
In 2019 Rosalía took part in the Pedro Almodóvar film Pain and Glory. She had previously contributed vocals to the soundtracks of Arde Madrid and Paquita Salas. In March 2019, Rosalía embarked on her first global concert tour, El Mal Querer Tour, to further promote El Mal Querer, with shows in South America, North America, Europe and Africa.While on tour, Rosalía issued several songs. On 28 March 2019, she released a second collaboration with Balvin, "Con Altura". Despite initially receiving mixed reviews from critics, "Con Altura" topped the charts in Argentina, Colombia, the Dominican Republic, Mexico, Venezuela and Spain. Its music video, directed by Director X, became the most-watched music video by a female artist of 2019. It also spawned her nickname "La Rosalía" and its choreography eventually became viral and a moment in Latin pop culture. "Con Altura" won two MTV Video Music Awards for Best Latin Video and Best Choreography, making her the first Spanish act to win one. It also won Best Collaboration at the 2019 MTV Europe Music Awards and Best Urban Song at the 2019 Latin Grammys. The song has sold over seven million copies worldwide so far.

In May, Rosalía released the song "Aute Cuture". It became her third number one in Spain and earned a Latin Grammy nomination for Record of the Year. In July, she released the single Fucking Money Man, which includes two tracks: "Milionària" (which she sang in Catalan) and "Dios Nos Libre del Dinero". On 15 August, she released her collaboration with Ozuna "Yo x ti, tú x mí", which became her fifth number one single in Spain. In November, Rosalía released "A Palé", which features background vocals by James Blake, who she had worked earlier with on "Barefoot in the Park". In December, Rosalía was featured alongside Lil Baby on the remix of Travis Scott's "Highest in the Room". Peaking at four, this marked the first time a song of hers entered the Global Spotify chart. She was awarded the Rising Star award at Billboard's Women in Music for the international recognition she achieved during the year and for "changing the sound of today's mainstream music with her fresh flamenco-influenced pop". Rosalía's performance of "Juro Que" at the 62nd Grammy Awards marked the first time a Spanish female artist performed at the gala. She also became the first Spanish-singing act in history to be nominated for Best New Artist. During lockdown, Rosalía released "Dolerme" and, in May, "TKN", her second collaboration with Travis Scott, which eventually became her first entry on the Billboard Hot 100, debuting at number 66, as well as the sixth number-one single of hers in her home country. The song became went viral on TikTok. The music video for "TKN", directed by Nicolás Méndez, won the Latin Grammy Award for Best Short Form Music Video. It also spawned a nomination for Best Direction at the Berlin Music Video Awards. On 22 June, Arca and Rosalía released their highly anticipated collaboration "KLK", included in the musician's album KiCk i.

2020–present: Collaborations and Motomami 
Recording sessions for Rosalía's third studio album started as early as 2019. Due to unforeseen circumstances from the COVID-19 pandemic, Rosalía relocated to Miami where she continued to work on the album while also providing vocals to multiple songs. On 4 September 2020, a remix of Sech's "Relación", which also features Daddy Yankee, Farruko and J Balvin, was released, earning Rosalía her second entry on the Billboard Hot 100, peaking at 64. She also took part in Bad Bunny's third solo studio album, El Último Tour del Mundo, on the track "La Noche De Anoche", which was later released as a single on Valentine's Day. The collaboration, performed on Saturday Night Live, became a huge commercial success, debuting at number two on the Spotify global chart with 6.63 million streams in a single day, marking the biggest debut for a song fully sung in Spanish in history. A week later, she collaborated alongside The Weeknd on the remix of "Blinding Lights" and, in January, with Billie Eilish on "Lo Vas a Olvidar", which was featured in a special episode of Euphoria. Rosalía later collaborated with Oneohtrix Point Never and Tokischa on "Nothing's Special" and "Linda" respectively.

On 2 November 2021, Rosalía announced the title of her new album Motomami. It was released on 18 March 2022 through Columbia Records. Promotion prior to the album release encompassed the release of three singles and the promotional singles "Hentai" and "Candy". The lead single "La Fama", featuring The Weeknd, is an experimental bachata that saw great commercial success. It became Rosalía's seventh number one single in Spain while also peaking at five in France and reaching the top ten spot in eight other countries. In December 2021, Rockstar Games launched a new Grand Theft Auto Online radio station, Motomami Los Santos, curated by Rosalía and Arca. In February 2022, Rosalía revealed the album artwork for Motomami and released "Saoko" as the album's second single to wide critical acclaim. The song's accompanying music video, directed by Valentin Petit, was shot in Kyiv, mainly at Podilskyi Bridge. For its editing done by Petit and Jon Echeveste, the video would go on to win the MTV Video Music Award for Best Editing. On 24 February, Rosalía released "Chicken Teriyaki" as the album's third single.

Upon release, Motomami received universal acclaim from music critics, many of whom praised the experimentation and genre-bending sounds. Motomami received a perfect score from various publications, including The Telegraph, The Independent and Variety and was given four stars or more by Clash, Rolling Stone, Rockdelux, The Guardian etc. Pitchfork crowned Motomami with its "Best New Music" honor writing, "It feels rare to hear an album that's so experimental, that aspires to stretch itself out across genres and play with form, and that attains exactly what it sets out to achieve. Rosalía was already a formidable singer, but here she also sounds like she learned that with global superstardom comes the freedom to set her own agenda". The album has become the best reviewed and most discussed album of 2022 on Metacritic. Commercially, Motomami entered twenty-two charts in nineteen countries and reached the top ten in seven countries, two of them number-ones. The album entered major market charts, reaching the top forty in both on the UK Albums Chart and the Billboard 200. On Spotify, it achieved the biggest debut for a Spanish-language album by a female artist on the platform's history, with 16.3 million streams in the first day.

In July 2022, Rosalía embarked on her second worldwide concert tour, Motomami World Tour, to further promote Motomami, with shows in Europe, South America and North America. The setlist featured four unreleased tracks including "Despechá", which was later released on 28 July to global success. Rosalía later took part in the forthcoming projects by Romeo Santos, Niño de Elche, and Wisin & Yandel.

At the 23rd Annual Latin Grammy Awards in November 2022, Motomami won the four categories in which it was nominated in, which were Album of the Year, Best Alternative Music Album, Best Engineered Album and Best Recording Package. Rosalía was the first woman and sixth act overall to win Album of the Year twice as a lead artist. She also received two nominations at the 65th Annual Grammy Awards for Best Latin Rock or Alternative Album and Best Music Film for Motomami Tiktok Live, winning for the former category. However, media such as Rolling Stone, Pitchfork, the New York Times and W believed that the Recording Academy and the Grammys had snubbed Motomami for the Album of the Year category.

In 2023, Rolling Stone ranked Rosalía at number 200 on its list of the 200 Greatest Singers of All Time. In February 2022, she collaborated with Coca-Cola to create a limited edition flavor under its 'Coca-Cola Creations' brand called 'Move'.

Artistry

Musical style and genres 
Rosalía's music has been described as "challenging" both for her and for the listener. Noted for the conceptuality and constant genre transformation of her albums and singles, Rosalía's music has evolved from folk to the mainstream and avant-pop. As Rosalía has a master's degree in flamenco interpretation, she started her professional career as a full flamenco singer. 2017 saw the release of her debut album Los Ángeles, a folk record in which Rosalía "is posited as the contemporary cantaora who has better understood the current times". The singer has, ever since, been described as "an old soul trapped in a young body" due to the maturity of the genre. After the release of "Malamente" in May 2018, which rose the singer's popularity to a national level, her music was described as a "heavily exciting fusion of flamenco and modern arts". American magazine Pitchfork called the singer's voice "a soft liquid velvet" and wrote that "Malamente consumes the listener with drums and soft synthesizers that drag you to their world completely". After releasing El Mal Querer later that year, The Guardian gave it a perfect score and stated: "the Catalan singer's potent, smart second album is more complex than any Latin pop currently in the charts". During the three-year droplet era that started with the 2019 release "Con Altura", Rosalía's music evolved to a more mainstream urbano field without leaving the flamenco essence that characterizes her artistry. Described by Rolling Stone as "one of the most daring and reckless productions of recent years", Rosalía's 2022 studio album Motomami "redifined mainstream" by taking reggaeton as its main influence and blending it with traditional music of Latin America as well as with other genres such as industrial or jazz. The singer has stated that she listens to a vast catalogue of music specially when she is making a record in the urge to learn about them. Rosalía has cited the 2011 eponymous album by James Blake as one of the most impactful records of her life.

In his El Mal Querer review, The Guardians Alexis Petridis wrote: "She can really sing [...] but her voice is audibly rooted in a different musical tradition to the usual styles in which pop vocalists perform. The standard set of tricks (post-Whitney extemporisation overload, sub-Winehouse aged soul, please-compare-me-to-Kate-Bush kooky swooping, etc) are all noticeable by their absence. Instead, her voice is powerful and gutsily emotive: her melismas sound more Middle Eastern than Mariah Carey. Despite her wide vocal range, Rosalía tends to use Auto-Tune aesthetically in songs and live performances.

The songwriting skills of Rosalía have recently been questioned and criticized for being "random" and "kitsch". Generally, her lyrics deal with various topics and contain multiple references to general and pop culture. Those references can also be seen in her visual work, which she considers the "crutial way of communication between the artist and the consumer". Graphic artist Carlota Guerrero is one of the singer's best friends. Rosalía's visual inspiration mainly comes from Spanish tradition and Eastern culture, mainly Japanese. The singer has wide knowledge of art history, which she translates to her public by constantly recreating religious portraits, contemporary paintings, and movie scenes within her musical projects. She has cited Pedro Almodóvar and Andrei Tarkovsky as her favorite filmmakers, Gaspar Noé's Enter the Void (2009) and Wong Kar-wai's Fallen Angels (1995) as her favorite films, and Jean-Michel Basquiat as her favorite artist.

Rosalía has been accused of cultural appropriation by some Romani people because she adapts Romani customs into her style, and she draws from the flamenco music tradition, which is often thought to be from Romani people in Andalusia. However, the origin of flamenco music is not known precisely, and it probably fused musical practices from three sources: Moorish, Jewish and Romani cultures. Responding to this criticism, Rosalía said, "music is universal."

Influences 

Rosalía has cited Camarón de la Isla, James Blake and Björk as her major musical influences. In 2019 she told MTV "when I was 13 years old I started listening to him [Camarón de la Isla] by chance. This genre, flamenco, was what my high-school friends listened to and so did I. When I discovered him I was like 'oh my God!' I didn't think anyone was capable to sing with such a voice; it would go right through me so heartily. He was my introduction to flamenco. Thanks to him I discovered this vast universe within this music style which is almost endless and very exciting." Another flamenco influence of Rosalía is La Niña de los Peines. She states that despite not enjoying her recordings at first, she ended up appreciating her melodies and realized that she was a true pioneer since, at the time she became popular, most flamenco singers were men. She said: "flamenco is a masculine art form by tradition and there she was, with all her creativity as a woman. She became a professional at the time when it was very unusual". About Björk, Rosalía told Pitchfork that she "thanks God for Björk's existence" and for "paving the way for female producers". When she was asked about the impact James Blake had on her, she said: "I started listening to him when I was at university. His music has left a mark on me; not only the bold character of his production but also its minimalism and free structures. When I listen to him, I can feel that he allows himself a lot of freedom. I personally think that he doesn't do music to please nobody but only for himself." Rosalía collaborated with Blake on his song "Barefoot in the Park", which was released as the fourth single of his 2019 album Assume Form. She has also cited Aventura, Beyoncé, Frank Ocean, Héctor Lavoe, Kate Bush, Kanye West, Rihanna, Lil' Kim, Lole y Manuel, M.I.A., Shakira, Tego Calderón, Pharrell Williams and Lauryn Hill as direct musical inspirations.

The biggest fashion influence of Rosalía is Lola Flores. In an interview with Billboard she stated: "I love her. I love the attitude and the strength she had". She also mentioned Carmen Amaya; "she used to wear masculine clothes in a moment that any woman was dancing in typically-man clothing". Rosalía has become a regular fashion show attendee, expressing her love for Palomo Spain, Dion Lee, Martin Margiela, Dapper Dan, Pepa Salazar, Matthew Williams, Alexander Wang, Burberry, Dominnico, Dior and Versace among others. She has attended the Met Gala twice, dressed in Rick Owens and Givenchy.

Impact

Spanish music industry 
Forbes named Rosalía in their list of "Most Influential Spanish Women" in 2020 and in 2022. In 2021, Pitchfork named Rosalía one of the most important artists of the last 25 years.

On cultural appropriation 
The popularization of new flamenco, both nationally and worldwide, has allowed new artists such as María José Llergo to reach a wider audience internationally. In 2020, The Atlantic stated that Rosalía had "turned the harrowing music of Andalusia into a global phenomenon". Rosalía has been credited with inspiring some contemporary artists, such as Marina, Kacey Musgraves and Christina Aguilera. The resurgence of flamenco music alongside Rosalía's work has led to discussions of cultural appropriation, sometimes dubbed "the Rosalía polemic". Rosalía has been accused of stealing the culture of the Spanish Romani people (Gitanos), who claim this artistic expression as their own, as it has been one of the few ways of free cultural expression Gitanos had available to them, in the face of discrimination and persecution within wider society. Purists view flamenco performance by Catalans, non-Gitanos, or non-Andalusians, such as Rosalía, as unfair and illegitimate. Others have defended Rosalía, saying that, in a global interconnected world, where exposure to cultural traditions and art forms are widely accessed, Rosalía's success can inspire international appreciation of this artform, and compare the situation to Madonna's use of Spanish traditions sparking international interest in Spanish culture and art.

The New York Times said in 2019: "the debate on the cultural appropriation of the Spanish singer is unfair: her music embodies, with height, the most eloquent artistic form of globalization: the remix". When asked about this topic, she responded: "I've realized that it is not that I am specifically being attacked, it is the situation where there are people who, like me, have been fortunate enough to be able to study music, which they have wanted. And having options that other people don't have", stating that this is more of a political issue and a matter of privileges. Following her win for Best Latin Video for "Con Altura" at the 2019 MTV Video Music Awards, Rosalía broached a related discussion, as to whether the expression "Latin" (derived from a Romance language, like Spanish) has been misunderstood and has evolved to "Latino" (person from Latin American countries previously ruled by the Spanish and Portuguese empires), extending the debate about cultural appropriation and whether she should or should not be nominated in Latin categories at award shows. Rosalía also discussed the topic at the 2020 Latin Billboard Music Week, where Leila Cobo, host of VP Latin, stated: "Billboard categorizes music sung in the Spanish language as Latin music. You are a Spanish artist, not a Latin American but your music is called 'Latin' because it is sung in Spanish. It is also very interesting to see how this term is only used in the United States". Rosalía has also said that she feels "uncomfortable" when this term is used on her. Stemming from these debates, Rosalía has received online criticism.

Personal life 
She is of paternal Asturian and maternal Catalan heritage. Her paternal grandparents were of Galician and Andalusian origin. One of her great-grandfathers was Cuban. She is fluent in Catalan, Spanish and English.

Relationships 
In 2016, Rosalía started dating Spanish rapper C. Tangana. They co-wrote eight of the eleven songs of Rosalía's sophomore album El Mal Querer and collaborated vocally twice. They broke up in May 2018. Since then, the couple has referenced each other in songs, social media posts, interviews and music videos. In April 2020, Tangana told the press that there "exists a good friendship between the two".

Since late 2019, she has been in a relationship with Puerto Rican singer Rauw Alejandro, and made it public in September 2021. The two had worked together on his debut studio album, Afrodisíaco, which was released on 13 November 2020. In March 2023, they announced they would be releasing a joint EP titled "RR".

Political views and religion 
Rosalía identifies as a feminist. After being congratulated at the 2019 Billboard Women in Music gala, the singer stated: "I was fifteen when I entered a recording studio for the first time having all this women as references. I was so shocked by the fact that there were only men in that session that, since that moment, I've been fighting for having the same number of men and women in the studio. As simple as that". Rosalía has a garter belt buckle tattooed on her left thigh in reference to a 1970 body art performance by Valie Export. In the tattoo, the garter appears as a symbol of a past slavery, the dress as the suppression of sexuality, the garter as an attribute of a femininity not determined by ourselves. A social ritual that covers one of the physical needs, the opposition of our culture to the body is clear. The garter as a sign of belonging to a class that demands a specific behavior becomes a memory. Rosalía is also pro-choice. During a concert in Mexico, she wore a green handkerchief in support of the National Campaign for the Right to Legal, Safe and Free Abortion. The singer is also a firm LGBT supporter. All profits from her Viva Glam cosmetic campaign were to be given in support of women, youth and the LGBT community. In July 2021, she condemned the killing of Samuel Luiz, stating, "Samuel didn't die, he was assassinated".

As for Rosalía's religious beliefs, she revealed that she has never been baptized nor taken to church by her parents. Her grandmother, who was Christian, used to take her to church if she voluntarily asked to. There she began to believe in God despite never having submitted to the Catholic Church nor considering herself Christian.

As for politics and international conflicts, in November 2019, following a second general Spanish election in the country within six months, Rosalía tweeted "fuck Vox". Vox is a far-right nationalist political party that had earned a lot of seats at the Spanish Parliament and was constantly growing in popularity at the time. After being asked about politics at a press conference a couple days later, she said: "I think it is a very delicate topic and I don't think this is the place to talk about it." In May 2020, Rosalía expressed anger for the murder of George Floyd and briefly attended a protest in Miami in defense of racial equality, leaving early in order to appear on a virtual benefit concert organized by TeleHit. In October, she offered her song "A Palé" for a vote-encouraging campaign of Sony Music for the 2020 United States presidential election titled "Your Voice. Your Power. Your Vote".

Discography 

 Los Ángeles (2017)
 El Mal Querer (2018)
 Motomami (2022)

Filmography

Film

Television

Music videos

Commercials

Tours 

 Los Ángeles Tour (2017–2018)
 El Mal Querer Tour (2019)
 Motomami World Tour (2022)
 '23 “Festivales”

Awards and nominations

References

External links 

 
 Rosalía on Viberate
 

 
1992 births
21st-century Spanish actresses
21st-century Spanish singers
21st-century Spanish women singers
Actresses from Catalonia
Columbia Records artists
Feminist musicians
Flamenco dancers
Flamenco singers
Grammy Award winners
Latin Grammy Award winners
Latin music songwriters
Latin R&B singers
Spanish LGBT rights activists
Living people
Musicians from Catalonia
MTV Europe Music Award winners
New flamenco
People from Baix Llobregat
People from Barcelona
Singers from Catalonia
Spanish deists
Spanish feminists
Spanish people of Asturian descent
Spanish people of Catalan descent
Spanish people of Galician descent
Spanish women pop singers
Urbano musicians
Women in Latin music